Quien Sabe Ranch is a ranch in Fremont County, Wyoming, about  northeast of Shoshoni. The ranch structures date to the 1880s, part of a ranching operation established around 1883 by three English immigrants: Harry Jevons, Richard Ashworth and Richard Berry. The ranch centered on an area next to Hoodoo Creek. At first the ranch was called Hoodoo ranch, but after an altercation with Mexican caballeros who lived in the neighborhood the ranch became known as "Quien Sabe" ("who knows?") for the evasive answers given by the Mexicans to the English ranchers. After a series of transactions between the partners the property was deeded to Ashworth by Jevons to secure a $4747.62 loan. Jevons killed himself after losing his money gambling in Meeteetse.

The low-pitched roof is waterproofed with bentonite clay. Other buildings include a bunkhouse, an icehouse, a blacksmith shop and a dugout.

The ranch is associated in oral tradition with Butch Cassidy, who was supposed to have had an interest in the land in the 1890s, but no records apart from an account by Cassidy's sister Lulu Parker Betensen attest to this. The ranch was acquired by Emil Thoren in 1907, whose family kept it through much of the 20th century.

Quien Sabe Ranch was placed on the National Register of Historic Places on April 18, 1991.

References

External links
 Quien Sabe Ranch at the Wyoming State Historic Preservation Office

National Register of Historic Places in Fremont County, Wyoming
Ranches on the National Register of Historic Places in Wyoming
Historic districts on the National Register of Historic Places in Wyoming